The Fairmont Château Laurier is a  hotel with 429 guest rooms in the downtown core of Ottawa, Ontario, Canada, located near the intersection of Rideau Street and Sussex Drive and designed in a French Gothic Revival Châteauesque style to complement the adjacent Parliament buildings. The hotel is above the Colonel By Valley, home of the Ottawa Locks of the Rideau Canal, and overlooks the Ottawa River. The main dining room (now the Laurier Room) overlooks Major's Hill Park. The reception rooms include the Wedgewood-blue Adam Room; the Laurier Room defined by Roman columns; the Empire-style ballroom and the Drawing Room featuring cream and gold plaster ornament. The hotel was designated a national historic site in 1980.

History

Grand Trunk Railway 1909–1923

When the hotel opened, private rooms cost $2 a night; 155 of the 350 bedrooms featured a private bath while the other 104 rooms had washstands with hot and cold water connections. In addition dormitories and common bathrooms were available as were rooms for travelling salesmen with sample tables to display goods.

The hotel features original Tiffany stained-glass windows and hand-moulded plaster decorations dating back to 1912. The walls were faced with Indiana limestone and feature conical turrets, dormer windows topped by a copper roof. The gables are carved with flowers, scrolls and crests. The lobby floors were constructed of Belgian marble.
 
The plans for the hotel initially generated some controversy, as the Château was to be constructed on what was then a portion of Major's Hill Park. Sir Wilfrid Laurier, then the Prime Minister of Canada, helped secure the important site for the construction, and the hotel was eventually named in his honour. Laurier's government was also subsidizing the Grand Trunk Railway's Pacific Line. Further conflict ensued when the original architect, Bradford Gilbert, from New York was dismissed due to disagreements with Grand Trunk executives, and they engaged the Montreal firm of Ross and Macfarlane to complete the design.

The hotel was to be opened on 26 April 1912, but Hays, who was returning to Canada for the hotel opening, perished aboard the RMS Titanic when it sank on 15 April. Grand Trunk officials held a more subdued opening ceremony on 12 June 1912, with Sir Wilfrid Laurier in attendance. The sub-basement housed laundry, repair shops, engineering and electrical departments. A barber shop was added in 1918.

In August 1914, Major Raymond Brutinel enrolled the first recruits for the Canadian Automobile Machine Gun Brigade (CAMGB) at the hotel. A memorial plaque with a circular bas-relief of Brigadier-General Brutinel and a bas-relief of machine gunners on Vimy Ridge is dedicated to the memory of Brutinel, who commanded the CAMGB, the members of the Canadian Machine Gun Brigade who died on active service, and in honour of those who served.

Canadian National Railway 1923–1988

When the Grand Trunk became part of the Canadian National Railway in 1923, the Château Laurier became one of CN's most important hotels. In addition to hotel guests, the Château Laurier has also served over the years as the home of two important Ottawa institutions. From July 1924 to October 2004, the seventh and eight floors at the top were home to the Canadian Broadcasting Corporation's local English- and French-language radio stations. Photographer Yousuf Karsh maintained his studio and residence at the Château Laurier for many years.

Although the exterior of the addition was French-inspired, the interior lobby resembled an English or Scottish baronial hall with dark-oak panelling, a railed gallery overlooking the double-height space and trophies of the hunt. The lobby led to a convention hall, music room and gentlemen's lounge. The ballroom featured vaulted ceiling, columns and rich drapes. The ultra-modern kitchen was designed to cater to up to 5,000 people. The Jasper Tea Room designed by Edwin Holgate in 1929, featured Pacific Coast aboriginal art, columns carved into totem poles surrounding a dance floor, and lamps decorated with motifs of bears, eagles and crows. From 1929 to 1991, the Canadian Grill was a softly-lit and dark-panelled below-ground restaurant where diners ate the specialty, roast prime rib of beef au jus and danced to live music.

In 1930, the hotel added a 60-foot (18 m) indoor pool in Art Deco style. In the 1930s and 1940s, the "therapeutic" spas offered electric therapy, ultra-violet ray lamps and alternate streams of hot and cold water to clients with nervous afflictions, polio or back problems.

For years, the hotel thrived, playing host to royalty, heads of state, political figures, celebrities and members of Canada's elite. R. B. Bennett lived in a suite in the hotel during his term as Canadian prime minister, from 1930 to 1935.

During the 1960s and 1970s, the construction of numerous competing hotels in the capital, as well as the closure of Union Station, led to a slow decline in the Château's fortunes.

In 1965, the Jasper Lounge, was redecorated into a mock English tavern called the Cock and Lion with oak and old brick walls. The union went to court to protest management's decision to replace waiters with young women in low-cut tops to serve in the new pub, but lost.

In 1981, the hotel was designated a National Historic Site of Canada. The Westin Hotel opened across the street in 1983 and owners undertook a  renovation in the 1980s to refurbish and renovate the Château Laurier, restoring its position as Ottawa's pre-eminent hotel. They added a new porte-cochère on Wellington Street, lightened the lobby's dark wood and removed the animal trophies and barber shop. The fourth floor featured a separate lounge and concierge desk. The smoke shop became the Reading Room and a skylit boutique mall replaced the Cock and Lion lounge. In 1985, Zoe's Lounge opened in a new glassed-in area overlooking Rideau Street.

By 1991, Peacock Alley, which was a broad corridor on the main level that extended along the west side of hotel was replaced by Wilfrid's, featuring views of the Parliament Buildings, the Rideau Canal locks and the Ottawa River.

Canadian Pacific Hotels 1988–1999
The hotel was operated by Canadian National Hotels until the chain was purchased by Canadian Pacific Hotels in 1988.

Fairmont Hotels and Resorts 1999–present

In 1999, it was renamed the Fairmont Château Laurier after Canadian Pacific Hotels bought the American Fairmont hotel chain and changed its name to Fairmont Hotels and Resorts. The new look was provided by Wilfrid's on the main level, its big windows giving light and views of the Parliament Buildings, the Rideau Canal locks and the Ottawa River.

The hotel is just metres away from some of the capital's most important landmarks and state/diplomatic buildings, including Parliament Hill, the Rideau Canal, the National Gallery of Canada, the ByWard Market, the National War Memorial, the U.S. Embassy, and the CF Rideau Centre. Given its proximity to these buildings and the fact that it has served as a home and meeting place for many notable political figures over the years, the hotel has often been referred to as "the third chamber of Parliament".

The hotel was the inspiration for the "Hotel du Canada" at the Canada (Epcot) pavilion in Orlando, Florida. In 2000, the Royal Architectural Institute of Canada chose the building as one of the top 500 buildings produced in Canada during the last millennium. Coinciding with its 100th anniversary, Fairmont Château Laurier was included amongst other architecturally interesting and historically significant buildings in Doors Open Ottawa, held 2–3 June 2012.

In 2013, Capital Hotel Limited Partnership (an affiliate of Vancouver's Larco Investments Ltd.) purchased the hotel, but retained Fairmont to manage it. In September 2016, Larco proposed a major addition to create "long-term stay" suites. The design of the addition differs considerably from that of the original building, and has been met with criticism. Ottawa council unanimously voted to download the power to approve the renovation to city staff in June 2018. Because of an unprecedented public outcry, there was a motion to revoke Larco's Heritage permit until it submitted a design that would be more in keeping with the original structure. That motion was defeated by Ottawa Council by a vote of 13–10 on July 11, 2019, and the project proceeded.

Despite initial proceedings, UNESCO has requested that the extension on the hotel be re-assessed, as there are concerns about the integrity of the view of the surrounding canals.

In 2018, the hotel was the setting of the dramatic web series Chateau Laurier. Due to budget constraints, however, the series was actually filmed at the Fairmont Royal York in Toronto.

See also

Russell House (Ottawa) – the Château Laurier succeeded the Russell as Ottawa's premier hotel
List of designated heritage properties in Ottawa

References

Bibliography

 
 
 Fleury, K. Maureen. "Haunted Château Laurier Hotel, Ottawa", 8 January 2008.

External links

Emporis Listing

Canadian National Railway hotels
Designated heritage properties in Ottawa
Grand Trunk Railway hotels
Hotels in Ottawa
Hotel buildings completed in 1912
Hotels established in 1912
Canadian Pacific Railway hotels
Fairmont Hotels and Resorts
Châteauesque architecture in Canada
National Historic Sites in Ontario
Ross and Macdonald buildings
Hotels on the National Historic Sites of Canada register
Tourist attractions in Ottawa
Canadian Broadcasting Corporation buildings
1912 establishments in Ontario